Moso or MoSo can refer to:

 MoSo, a music and technology festival in Saskatoon, Canada
 Moso (island), an island in Vanuatu
 Missouri Southern State University, sometimes nicknamed "MoSo"
 Phyllostachys edulis, a species of bamboo also called "moso bamboo"
 Mosuo, an ethnic minority in the People's Republic of China also spelled "Moso"
 Moos in Passeier, a town in Italy known in Italian as "Moso in Passiria"